Barguna-1 is a constituency represented in the Jatiya Sangsad (National Parliament) of Bangladesh since 2008 by Dhirendra Debnath Shambhu of the Awami League.

Boundaries 
The constituency encompasses Amtali, Barguna Sadar, and Taltali upazilas.

History 
The constituency was created in 1984 from a Patuakhali constituency when the former Patuakhali District was split into two districts: Barguna and Patuakhali.

Ahead of the 2008 general election, the Election Commission redrew constituency boundaries to reflect population changes revealed by the 2001 Bangladesh census. The 2008 redistricting altered the boundaries of the constituency.

Members of Parliament

Elections

Elections in the 2010s

Elections in the 2000s

Elections in the 1990s

References

External links
 

Parliamentary constituencies in Bangladesh
Barguna District